Real Talk is a studio album by a Jamaican reggae singer, Konshens. It was released on December 22, 2010.

This album was mainly released in Japan only because of the recording label he was signed to at that time.

Track listing

References

External links
 vpreggae.com

Konshens albums
2010 albums